The International Journal of Primatology is a peer-reviewed academic journal that publishes original research papers on the study of primates. Articles published in the journal are drawn from a number of disciplines involved in primatological research, including anthropology, zoology, psychology, paleontology, sociology, genetics, and conservation biology.

Publication history
The journal was first published in March 1980, originating as the official journal of the International Primatological Society. It was initially published quarterly on behalf of the society by Plenum Press, now part of Springer Science+Business Media. In 1988 the publication frequency was increased to bimonthly.

References

External links 

 
 International Primatological Society website

Primatology journals
Publications established in 1980
Bimonthly journals
Springer Science+Business Media academic journals
English-language journals